Xanthomonas hyacinthi is a species of bacteria.

References

External links
Type strain of Xanthomonas hyacinthi at BacDive -  the Bacterial Diversity Metadatabase

Xanthomonadales